Events from the year 1333 in Ireland.

Incumbent
 Lord: Edward III

Events
 Maurice FitzGerald, 1st Earl of Desmond, released
 Conchobhar O Domhnaill succeeds his father, Áed, as King of Tír Conaill 
 Ó Ceallaigh of Uí Maine at war with Ó Conchobhair
 Donnchadh mac Aedh Ó Ceallaigh captured and imprisoned by King Toirdhelbach of Connacht
 Friar John Clyn (d. 1349) begins his chronicle, "The Annals of Ireland"
 Clanricarde dynasty established in Connacht

Births

Deaths
 6 June – William Donn de Burgh, 3rd Earl of Ulster, murdered in the Burke Civil War
 Tomaltach mac Donnchadh Mac Diarmata, lord of Tir Ailella
 King Áed of Tír Conaill; "after taking the habit of a Grey Cistercian monk upon him, died in his own strong hold and was buried in the church of the Monastery of Eassa Ruadh."
 Gilbert Mac Goisdelb "in the centre of his own castle" by Cathal Mac Diarmata Gall
 Aedh Mac Con Shnama 
 Domnall Mac Con Shnama, chief of Muinter-Cinaith
 Mac an Ridhre (son of the knight) Mag Fhlannchadha, "material of a chief of Dartraighi, was killed by the Connachtmen."
 Richard Huskard, Norman settler

References

"The Annals of Ireland by Friar John Clyn", edited and translated with an Introduction, by Bernadette Williams, Four Courts Press, 2007. , pp. 240–244.
"A New History of Ireland VIII: A Chronology of Irish History to 1976", edited by T. W. Moody, F.X. Martin and F.J. Byrne. Oxford, 1982. .
http://www.ucc.ie/celt/published/T100001B/index.html
http://www.ucc.ie/celt/published/T100005C/index.html
http://www.ucc.ie/celt/published/T100010B/index.html

 
1330s in Ireland
Ireland
Years of the 14th century in Ireland